The 2022 season was the Trent Rockets second season of the 100 ball franchise cricket, The Hundred. The franchise had a positive season with both teams making it to the knockout stages. While the women's team were knockout in the semi-final to finish in 3rd place, the men's team won the group stage and won in the final to win their first title.

Players

Men's side 
 Bold denotes players with international caps.

Women's side 
 Bold denotes players with international caps.

Regular season

Fixtures (Men)

Fixtures (Women)
Due to the shortened women's competition, Trent Rockets didn't play against Northern Superchargers
.

Standings

Women

 advances to Final
 advances to the Eliminator

Men

 advances to Final
 advances to the Eliminator

Knockout stages

Men

Final

Women

Eliminator

References

The Hundred (cricket)
2022 in English cricket